William Robert Black (1859-1930) was an Australia mine-owner and philanthropist. He donated to establish many Presbyterian churches and supported schools, orphanages and other charitable institutions in Queensland.

Biography 
On 20 November 1922, the Queensland Governor Matthew Nathan officially opened the Industrial School for Boys on a site between Moggill Road and Jerrang Road (now 724 Moggill Road) at Indooroopilly (now Chapel Hill). It was operated by the Salvation Army for orphaned, abandoned and neglected boys. The  site was purchased for £2300 by Black and donated to the Salvation Army, He also paid £2700 to extend and renovate the buildings on site and for new furnishings. He also provided for £100 per annum for maintenance. When it opened, there were 35 boys under the supervision of the first superintendent, Ensign Rogan. The school could provide accommodation for 50 boys supervised by nine staff. In 1942 the school relocated to Washpool.

Beneficiaries 

Black made substantial donations to a number of institutions, including:

Churches 

 the Presbyterian Church at Burleigh Heads
 the Presbyterian Church at Cannon Hill
the Presbyterian Church at Enoggera
the Presbyterian Church in Maleny
the War Memorial stained glass window at St Andew's Presbyterian (now Uniting) Church in the Brisbane CBD

Education 

 Scots PGC College in Warwick
 Fairholme College in Toowoomba
 Blackheath College in Charters Towers
Emmanuel College, University of Queensland

Children's homes 

W. R. Black Children's Home at Chelmer
Blackheath Home for Children at Oxley
Salvation Army's Industrial School for Boys at Indooroopilly (now Chapel Hill)

Other institutions 

 Gold Coast Hospital in Southport
 Canberra Hotel in the Brisbane CBD, a temperance hotel

References 

19th-century Australian philanthropists
Australian miners
1930 deaths
1859 births
20th-century Australian philanthropists